The protected areas of the Northern Territory consists of protected areas managed by the governments of the Northern Territory and Australia and private organisations with a reported total area of  being 24.8% of the total area of the Northern Territory of Australia.

Summary by type and jurisdiction

Northern Territory Government

Coastal Reserves
 Casuarina
 Channel Point
 Shoal Bay

Conservation Areas
 Adelaide River Foreshore
 Daly River (Mt Nancar)
 Douglas River / Daly River Esplanade
 Harrison Dam
 Melacca Swamp
 Oolloo Crossing
 Stray Creek
 Tree Point

Conservation Covenants
 Lake Woods
 Newry Station Gouldian Finch
 Longreach Waterhole

Conservation Reserves
 Anna's Reservoir
Black Jungle/Lambells Lagoon	
 Blackmore River
 Bullwaddy
Channel Island
 Caranbirini
 Connells Lagoon
 Corroboree Rock
 Fogg Dam
 Henbury Meteorites
 Illamurta Springs
 Karlu Karlu / Devils Marbles 
 Kintore Caves
 Knuckey Lagoons
 Kuyunba
 Mac Clark (Acacia peuce)
 Napwerte/Ewaninga Rock Carvings
 Native Gap
 Rainbow Valley
 Tnorala (Gosse Bluff)
 Vernon Islands
Woodgreen

Historical Reserves
 Alice Springs Telegraph Station
 Arltunga
 Attack Creek
 Barrow Creek Telegraph Station
 Central Mount Stuart
 Chambers Pillar
 Gregory's Tree
 Heavitree Gap Police Station
 John Flynn
 John Flynn's Grave
 Ryan Well
 Tennant Creek Telegraph Station
 Victoria River Depot

Hunting Reserves
 Howard Springs

Management Agreement Areas
 Buffalo Creek
 Channel Island
 Junction Reserve

Marine Parks
 Arafura
 Arnhem
 Limmen
 Wessel

National Parks

 Barranyi (North Island)	 
 Charles Darwin	
 Djukbinj	
 Dulcie Range	
 Elsey	
 Finke Gorge	
 Garig Gunak Barlu	  
 Iytwelepenty / Davenport Range	  
 Judbarra / Gregory	  
 Keep River	
 Limmen	
 Litchfield	
 Mary River	
 Nitmiluk	 
 Tjoritja / West MacDonnell
 Watarrka

Nature Parks

 Berry Springs
 Butterfly Gorge
 Cutta Cutta Caves
 Giwining / Flora River
 Holmes Jungle
 Howard Springs
 Katherine Low Level
 Leaning Tree Lagoon
 Mataranka Pool
 N'Dhala Gorge
 Ruby Gap
 Trephina Gorge
 Umbrawarra Gorge
 Yeperenye/Emily and Jessie Gaps

Protected Areas
 Ilparpa Swamp Wildlife
 Joint Geological / Geophysical Research Station

Other places
 Alice Springs Desert Park
 George Brown Darwin Botanic Gardens
 Leanyer Recreation Park
 Manton Dam Recreation Area
 Owen Springs Reserve
 Territory Wildlife Park
 Wearyan River (Manangoora) Cycad Site
Windows on the Wetlands

Australian government

Indigenous Protected Areas 
The following Indigenous Protected Areas have been established in the Northern Territory:
 Angas Downs
 Anindilyakwa
 Dhimurru
 Djelk
 Laynhapuy
 Marri-Jabin (Thamurrurr)
 Northern Tanami
 Southern Tanami
 Warddeken
 Yanyuwa

National parks

The following national parks are managed by the Director of National Parks on the behalf of the Australian government and  indigenous land owners:
 Kakadu 
 Uluru-Kata Tjuta

Private protected areas

Northern Territory jurisdiction
See Conservation Covenants above

Australian Wildlife Conservancy sanctuaries
Australian Wildlife Conservancy owns and operates the following private protected areas in the Northern Territory:
 Fish River Station
 Henbury Station (in progress)
 Newhaven
 Pungalina-Seven Emu
 Wongalara

See also
 Protected areas of Australia
 National parks of the Northern Territory
Protected areas managed by the Australian government

References

External links
Parks and Wildlife Commission of the Northern Territory
Find a park to visit webpage

 
Northern Territory
Northern Territory-related lists